Neili is a railway station in Zhongli District, Taoyuan City, Taiwan served by Taiwan Railways.

Overview

The station has two island platforms and one side platform. As part of the Taoyuan Elevated Railway Project, an additional island platform is opened in 2017. The station has an underground passageway to connect the station front with the second platform and the newly constructed platform. The station also has an elevated walkway.

History
1 June 1902: The station opened for service as 崁仔脚驛.
1920: The station name was changed to 崁子脚驛.
10 February 1958: The name was changed to its current name.
1 August 2008: The station begins accepting EasyCard for payment.

Around the station
 Vanung University
 Yuan Ze University
 National Nei-Li Senior High School
 Nei-Li Junior High School
 Tzu-Chiang Junior High School
 Nei-Li Elementary School
 Tzu-Li Elementary School
 Xingren Elementary School
 Yuansheng Elementary School
 Taoyuan City Police Department, Zhongli Branch, Neili Office
 Advanced Semiconductor Engineering, Inc., Neili Factory

See also
 List of railway stations in Taiwan

References

1902 establishments in Taiwan
Railway stations in Taoyuan City
Railway stations served by Taiwan Railways Administration